Cassaro (Sicilian: Càssaru, in the local dialect: Càssuru) is a town and comune (municipality) in the Province of Syracuse, Sicily (Italy). The name is originally from the Arabic word القصر (al-Qasru) meaning "the castle." Cassaro has 859 inhabitants.

History
According to the Capibreve of Silvestri, in the Middle Ages the town belonged to the Spadafora family. Margherita Moleti Spadafora married the Baron Pietro Siracusa, who belonged to one of the oldest families in the town of Noto and was also Baron of Monastero and Xiridia. The Siracusa dynasty (formerly known as "Zaragoza") is of Spanish origin, documented in Sicily since 1283. Members of this Family has been also the lords of [Collesano], counts of Villalta and duque of Casteldimirto. Records are in the State Archiv of Palermo (Fondo Protonotaro). Beatrice Siracusa, the only daughter of the above-mentioned Pietro and Margherita Siracusa (who are also ancestor of the Queen Paola of Belgium) married Pietro Gaetani Baron of Sortino. Beatrice died with her son Guido during the earthquake of 1452. Their possessions passed to her son Cesare, ancestor of the actual Princes of Cassaro. The current princess is Sara Tononi.

Main sights
Sights in Cassaro include the Mother Church, dedicated to Saint Peter (started in the 17th century and ended in 1730), and the Church of Saint Anthony the Abbot (17th-18th century).

References